Karim Abdul-Jabbar Guédé (born 7 January 1985) is a former professional footballer who works as a scout for SC Freiburg. he started his career at amateur level with SC Concordia and Hamburger SV II. After impressing at Slovakian clubs Petržalka and Slovan Bratislava he represented the Slovakia national team and joined SC Freiburg where he spent fix seasons. He ended his career after one season with SV Sandhausen.

Club career
Guédé, born in Hamburg, is a son of Togolese mother and French father. After playing for the Oberliga Hamburg club SC Concordia von 1907 and Hamburger SV II he came to Artmedia Petržalka in July 2006. He made his Corgoň Liga debut in a 4–0 defeat against Trenčín on 9 September 2006. He began playing as a defensive midfielder in Artmedia, previously he played as a defender. In the next season he won the Double. He moved to ŠK Slovan Bratislava in January 2010. In his first season in a new club he won the Slovak Cup. He won his second Slovak Double in 2010–11. After five years in Slovakia he obtained Slovak citizenship and became a possible choice for the national team manager Vladimír Weiss.

In May 2018, Guédé left SC Freiburg after six seasons with the club.

In June, Guédé joined 2. Bundesliga side SV Sandhausen on a free transfer having agreed a one-year contract.

International career
Guédé made his Slovakia national team debut in the 2–1 away win against Austria on 10 August 2011 after gaining Slovakian citizenship. Five years earlier in 2006, Guédé was initially part of the Togo national team squad for the 2006 FIFA World Cup but never made an appearance because a shoulder injury stopped his debut.

After retirement
After retiring at the end of the 2018–19 season, Guédé returned to SC Freiburg where he was hired as a scout in France and Africa.

Honours
Artmedia
 Corgoň Liga: 2007–08
 Slovak Cup: 2007–08

Slovan
 Corgoň Liga: 2010–11
 Slovak Cup: 2009–10, 2010–11

References

External links
 
 Karim Guédé short profile at OpenLearn

1985 births
Living people
Footballers from Hamburg
Slovak footballers
Slovakia international footballers
German footballers
Slovak people of Togolese descent
Slovak people of French descent
German people of Togolese descent
German people of French descent
Naturalized citizens of Slovakia
Association football midfielders
FC St. Pauli players
SC Concordia von 1907 players
Hamburger SV II players
FC Petržalka players
ŠK Slovan Bratislava players
Slovak Super Liga players
SC Freiburg players
SV Sandhausen players
Bundesliga players
2. Bundesliga players
German expatriate footballers
German emigrants to Slovakia
Naturalised association football players